Expedition 11 (2005) was the 11th expedition to the International Space Station, using the Soyuz TMA-6, which stayed during the expedition for emergency evacuation.

European Space Agency Italian Astronaut Roberto Vittori launched with Expedition 11 on the Soyuz TMA-6 spacecraft and returned 24 April 2005 with Expedition 10 on Soyuz TMA-5.

Crew

Mission parameters
Perigee: ~384 km
Apogee: ~396 km
Inclination: ~51.6°
Orbital period: ~92 min

Mission objectives
On 28 July 2005 at 11:18 UTC, during mission STS-114, the Space Shuttle Discovery, docked to the Station, and  delivered a Control Moment Gyroscope to replace one failed unit and the External stowage platform 2 as part of the approximately 4.100 kg cargo carried in Discovery's payload bay and inside the Multi-Purpose Logistics Module Raffaello. On 6 August 2005 the Orbiter undocked from the ISS taking the MPLM back.

During the Expedition 11 mission, Russian Commander Sergei Krikalev exceeded the record for total time in space (formerly held by Sergei Avdeyev with 747.593 days). Krikalev at launch had spent 624.387 days in space. He passed the record on the 123rd day of the mission, on 16 August 2005. His cumulative time in space was 803 days and 9 hours and 39 minutes upon landing.

On 7 September 2005 the unpiloted Progress spacecraft 53 (P18) undocked from the station and was deorbited, to make way for the arrival of Progress 54 (P19) which docked in September 2005 and transferred around 2300 kg of cargo, (fuel, water, and dry cargo including oxygen generators) to the station.

On 3 October 2005 Soyuz TMA-7 docked bringing the Expedition 12 crew.

Thomas Reiter (ESA) was scheduled to join the mission in October 2005 on the supply mission STS-121 to the ISS, but due to that mission's delay until 2006 he became a crew member of Expedition 13.

Spacewalks
Two spacewalks were planned for Expedition 11 however only one took place. On 18 August 2005 19:02 UTC (3:02 p.m. EDT) the crew started a 4-hour, 58-minute spacewalk. They removed and brought inside the station a Russian Biorisk experiment container housing bacteria from the outside of Pirs; an MPAC (a micrometeoroid and orbital debris collector) and SEED (a materials exposure array) panel from the Zvezda Service Module; and the Matroska experiment, (radiation dosimeters in human-tissue-equivalent material). They installed a television camera on Zvezda, and checked a Korma contamination-exposure experiment tablet, and removed and replaced a materials exposure experiment container.

References

External links

spaceflight1.nasa.gov/station/ - NASA's ISS site
nasa.gov - NASA's Expedition 11 site, with current event updates
energia.ru/english - Energiya's official ISS-11 page
esa.int - A 28 April 2005 ESA article discussing how Thomas Reiter was scheduled to be the first ESA astronaut to stay long-term on the station
esa.int - A 25 April 2005 ESA article discussing ESA astronaut Roberto Vittori's (Italy) mission.
 Expedition 11 Photography

Expeditions to the International Space Station
2005 in spaceflight